La Negrillar is a volcanic cone and associated lava flow in Chile. It erupted basalts and andesite and its flows and cones are well preserved. It is one of several mafic centres in the region located along fault systems.

References

Volcanoes of Chile
Volcanic cones